Brad Pearce (born 16 August 1971) is a former Australian rules footballer who played for Carlton and the Brisbane Bears in the Australian Football League (AFL).

Pearce played both football and cricket as a junior, and after having focussed on cricket in 1987, where he played for the Victorian schoolboy team he returned to football in 1988 as part of the  junior system, playing in the Victorian Under-17 Teal Cup team. He played with the St Kilda minor grades from 1988 until 1990, but injuries interrupted his progress to the senior grade for the club. In 1992, he played in the TFL Statewide League for the South Launceston Football Club, where impressive performances in the forward-line attracted the attention of AFL recruiters. He was drafted by the Brisbane Bears in the 1992 mid-season draft, and played two senior matches due to a nasty groin injury for the club in 1993 before being delisted at the end of the year.

Pearce was then recruited by Carlton with its second-round selection in the 1994 pre-season draft. He played only two senior games in his first season, before enjoying a break-out season in 1995, at the age of 24. Playing as a fast-leading forward pocket, Pearce provided Carlton's forward-line with variety and an alternative avenue to goal to long-time full forward Stephen Kernahan, and he played 23 of 25 possible games for the season, kicked 52 goals, and kicked four goals in Carlton's Grand Final victory against .His speed was what this great football club needed and it's what he delivered. As a youngster, Pearce's speed was exemplary, cracking the 11 second barrier as a 17-year-old.

Pearce played for Carlton for a further four seasons, playing an average of thirteen games per season interrupted by a range of injuries. A ruptured patella injury prevented Pearce from greatness at a time when he was dominating AFL.  He retired at the end of the 1999 season, having played 77 games and kicked 151 goals over six seasons for the club. Had it not been for injuries, Pearce's legacy would have been much greater. Carlton fans though, hold him in great esteem as he was the speed that was required for the 1995 flag that the club was lacking.

Statistics

|-
|- style="background-color: #EAEAEA"
! scope="row" style="text-align:center" | 1993
|style="text-align:center;"|
| 13 || 2 || 1 || 1 || 6 || 3 || 9 || 1 || 0 || 0.5 || 0.5 || 3.0 || 1.5 || 4.5 || 0.5 || 0.0 || 0
|-
! scope="row" style="text-align:center" | 1994
|style="text-align:center;"|
| 19 || 2 || 0 || 1 || 6 || 2 || 8 || 4 || 0 || 0.0 || 0.5 || 3.0 || 1.0 || 4.0 || 2.0 || 0.0 || 0
|- style="background-color: #EAEAEA"
|style="text-align:center;background:#afe6ba;"|1995†
|style="text-align:center;"|
| 19 || 23 || 52 || 40 || 205 || 50 || 255 || 104 || 26 || 2.3 || 1.7 || 8.9 || 2.2 || 11.1 || 4.5 || 1.1 || 4
|-
! scope="row" style="text-align:center" | 1996
|style="text-align:center;"|
| 19 || 15 || 35 || 24 || 115 || 26 || 141 || 58 || 12 || 2.3 || 1.6 || 7.7 || 1.7 || 9.4 || 3.9 || 0.8 || 0
|- style="background-color: #EAEAEA"
! scope="row" style="text-align:center" | 1997
|style="text-align:center;"|
| 19 || 11 || 16 || 14 || 84 || 16 || 100 || 44 || 7 || 1.5 || 1.3 || 7.6 || 1.5 || 9.1 || 4.0 || 0.6 || 0
|-
! scope="row" style="text-align:center" | 1998
|style="text-align:center;"|
| 19 || 14 || 32 || 22 || 110 || 17 || 127 || 51 || 7 || 2.3 || 1.6 || 7.9 || 1.2 || 9.1 || 3.6 || 0.5 || 2
|- style="background-color: #EAEAEA"
! scope="row" style="text-align:center" | 1999
|style="text-align:center;"|
| 19 || 12 || 16 || 12 || 60 || 10 || 70 || 38 || 5 || 1.3 || 1.0 || 5.0 || 0.8 || 5.8 || 3.2 || 0.4 || 0
|- class="sortbottom"
! colspan=3| Career
! 79
! 152
! 114
! 586
! 124
! 710
! 300
! 57
! 1.9
! 1.4
! 7.4
! 1.6
! 9.0
! 3.8
! 0.7
! 6
|}

References

External links

1971 births
Living people
Carlton Football Club players
Carlton Football Club Premiership players
Australian rules footballers from Melbourne
Brisbane Bears players
South Launceston Football Club players
Burnie Dockers Football Club players
One-time VFL/AFL Premiership players
People from Springvale, Victoria